Goleniowski Park Przemysłowy - an industrial park in Goleniów, a district town in north-west Poland (West Pomeranian Voivodeship). The total area is about 400 ha. In the area: ship and Harbour (Police) and  Harbour (Szczecin and Świnoujście)), road and rail transport, Szczecin-Goleniów "Solidarność" Airport (Goleniów) and a centre of Goleniów.

“Goleniowski Park Przemysłowy” is a part of Kostrzyn–Slubice Special Economic Zone,

List of investors
 Abena Polska
 Akala Faraone
 Andaro International Transport
 Asia
 Baltic Spinning
 Benders
 Best Advice and Invest
 Chemical Alliance Polska
 Dancook
 DPL Transport Spedition
 Eurogranit – Adamus 
 Faymonville Polska
 GDR
 Gryfitlab
 Glancos Poland
 FHU Mul.ti Projekt
 HG Poland
 Index – Nieruchomości H. J. M. Skrzyniarz
 InCom
 PPH Integropol
 Jachink PT
 Kim Hurt
 LM Wind Power
 Lucky Union Foods
 Lębork Energia
 Frigomar
 MPT Stanro
 Nafa Polska
 Norpol
 Praxisprint
 PRD Poldróg Nowogard
 Prologis Poland
 PC Factory
 Polglass
 Rasch
 Reinertsen
 SIA
 SPRI Mazur
 Technologie Tworzyw Sztucznych
 Thermoplastic Winding Systems
 TM Toys
 Weber Polska
 VTS Hermanus Verdijk

References

External links
  Goleniowski Park Przemysłowy
  Goleniów Industrial Park – Polish Information and Foreign Investment Agency

Buildings and structures in West Pomeranian Voivodeship
Industrial parks in Poland
Goleniów County